The Anaheim Aces were a charter member of baseball's California League, founded in 1941 as a Class "C" minor league. The other charter teams were the Bakersfield Badgers, Fresno Cardinals, Merced Bears, Riverside Reds, San Bernardino Stars, Santa Barbara Saints, and Stockton Fliers. The Aces folded after the 1941 season, with America's entry into World War II.

External links
Baseball Reference

Baseball in Anaheim, California
Baseball teams established in 1941
Baseball teams disestablished in 1941
Defunct baseball teams in California
Defunct California League teams
Professional baseball teams in California
1941 disestablishments in California
1941 establishments in California
Sports teams in Anaheim, California